António Joaquim Bastos Marques Mendes (30 March 1934 – 15 June 2015) was a Portuguese lawyer and politician.

Background
He was born in Porto, Paranhos, a son of Joaquim Marques Mendes (Fornos de Algodres, Figueiró da Granja, 3 March 1892 – Porto, Paranhos, 19 January 1941), Director of Services in the Correios, Telégrafos e Telefones, and wife (m. Fafe, São Romão de Arões, 20 April 1933) Antónia Pereira da Costa Bastos (Fafe, São Romão de Arões, 18 December 1904 – Fafe, São Romão de Arões, 2 October 1990). He died in Porto in 2015.

Career
He is a Licentiate in Law from the Faculty of Law of the University of Coimbra.

He started his career as a lawyer.

Among other things he was a Co-Founder and a Member of the Social Democratic Party together with Francisco Sá Carneiro, Francisco Pinto Balsemão, Joaquim Magalhães Mota, Carlos Mota Pinto, João Bosco Mota Amaral, Alberto João Jardim and António Barbosa de Melo of then Popular Democratic Party. He became Mayor of the Municipal Chamber of Fafe, Deputy to the Portuguese Assembly of the Republic and also a Representative at the European Parliament for his Party.

Family
He married at Fafe, São Romão de Arões, on 29 November 1956 Maria Isabel Gonçalves, born in Fafe, Cepães, on 10 July 1933, an Elementary School teacher, daughter of Gervásio Gonçalves (Fafe, Cepães, Carreira, 1 June 1905 – Guimarães, Creixomil, 19 May 1993), an Industrialist, and first wife (m. Felgueiras, Felgueiras, 25 June 1928) Isabel Teixeira (Felgueiras, Jugueiras, 11 October 1902 – 22 August 1980). They are the parents of Luís Marques Mendes.

References

1934 births
2015 deaths
Members of the Assembly of the Republic (Portugal)
Social Democratic Party (Portugal) politicians
Mayors of places in Portugal
20th-century Portuguese lawyers
People from Porto
University of Coimbra alumni